The Yemen national under-20 football team represents Yemen in international under  20 football competitions, They recently qualified to 2014 AFC U-19 Championship in Myanmar.

Tournament records

FIFA U-20 World Cup

AFC U-19 Championship

 1975 as South Yemen and 1978 as North Yemen

Results and fixtures

Players

Current squad
The squad which played 2014 AFC U-19 Championship qualification

 

|-----
! colspan="9" bgcolor="#B0D3FB" align="left" |
|-----
 
  
 
  
  
  
   
|-----
! colspan="9" bgcolor="#B0D3FB" align="left" |
|-----
  
  
  
  
 
   
|-----
! colspan="9" bgcolor="#B0D3FB" align="left" |
|-----

Coaching staff

Former squads
2008 AFC U-19 Championship squads
2010 AFC U-19 Championship squads

External links

under-20
Asian national under-20 association football teams